Attorney General of the Maldives was introduced in 1932 under Sultun Muhammad Shamsuddeen III. It is responsible in upholding the law within a secure and a peace environment and defend the public interest. He is also designated as a member of the Cabinet of the Maldives.

The Attorney General office became part of Ministry of Law and Gender after the establishment in 2013 and Mohamed Anil became Minister of Law and Gender.

Azima Shukoor was the longest serving Attorney General and there has been 8 Attorneys General between 1993 and 2017.

Attorney General list since 1993

References

Politics of the Maldives